Tánima Rubalcaba Cantón (born 24 December 1980) is a Mexican retired footballer who played as a forward. She has been a member of the Mexico women's national team.

International career
Rubalcaba was part of the Mexican team at the 1999 FIFA Women's World Cup, but made no appearances during the tournament.

References

1980 births
Living people
Mexican women's footballers
Mexico women's international footballers
Place of birth missing (living people)
1999 FIFA Women's World Cup players
Women's association football forwards